The 15-minute city (FMC or 15mC) is an urban planning concept in which most daily necessities and services, such as work, shopping, education, healthcare, and leisure can be easily reached by a 15-minute walk or bike ride from any point in the city. This approach aims to reduce car dependency, promote healthy and sustainable living, and improve the overall quality of life for city dwellers.

Implementing the 15-minute city concept requires a multi-disciplinary approach, involving transportation planning, urban design, and policymaking, to create well-designed public spaces, pedestrian-friendly streets, and mixed-use developments. This change in lifestyle may include remote working which reduces daily commuting and is supported by the recent widespread availability of information and communications technology (ICT). The concept has been described as a "return to a local way of life".

The concept's roots can be traced to pre-modern urban planning traditions where walkability and community living were the primary focus before the advent of street networks and automobiles. In recent times, it builds upon similar pedestrian-centered principles found in New Urbanism, transit-oriented development, and other similar proposals that promote walkability, mixed-use developments, and compact, livable communities. Numerous models have been proposed about how the concept can be implemented, like 15-minute cities being built from a series of smaller 5-minute neighborhoods, also known as complete communities or walkable neighborhoods.

The concept gained significant traction in recent years after Paris mayor Anne Hidalgo included a plan to implement the 15-minute city concept during her 2020 re-election campaign. Since then, a number of cities worldwide have adopted the same goal and many researchers have used the 15-minute model as a spatial analysis tool to evaluate accessibility levels within the urban fabric.

History 
The 15-minute city concept is derived from historical ideas about proximity and walkability, such as Clarence Perry's controversial neighborhood unit. As an inspiration for the 15-minute city, an advisor to Anne Hidalgo, Professor Carlos Moreno, cited Jane Jacobs's model presented in The Death and Life of Great American Cities.

The ongoing climate crisis and global COVID-19 pandemic have prompted a heightened focus on the 15-minute city concept. In July 2020, the C40 Cities Climate Leadership Group published a framework for cities to "build back better" using the 15-minute concept, referring specifically to plans implemented in Milan, Madrid, Edinburgh, and Seattle after COVID-19 outbreaks. Their report highlights the importance of inclusive community engagement through mechanisms like participatory budgeting and adjusting city plans and infrastructure to encourage dense, complete, overall communities.

A manifesto published in Barcelona in April 2020 proposed radical change in the organization of cities in the wake of COVID-19, and was signed by 160 academics and 300 architects. The proposal has four key elements: reorganization of mobility, (re) naturalization of the city, de-commodification of housing, and de-growth.

Research models 

The 15-minute city is a proposal for developing a polycentric city, where density is made pleasant, one's proximity is vibrant, and social intensity (a large number of productive, intricately linked social ties) is real. The key element of the model has been described by Carlos Moreno as "chrono-urbanism" or a refocus of interest on time value rather than time cost.

Moreno and the 15-minute city 
Moreno's 2021 article introduced the 15-minute city concept as a way to ensure that urban residents can fulfill six essential functions within a 15-minute walk or bike from their dwellings: living, working, commerce, healthcare, education and entertainment. The framework of this model has four components; density, proximity, diversity and digitalization.

Moreno cites the work of Nikos Salingaros, who theorizes that an optimal density for urban development exists which would encourage local solutions to local problems. The authors discuss proximity in terms of both space and time, arguing that a 15-minute city would reduce the space and time necessary for activity. Diversity in this 15-minute city model refers to mixed-use development and multicultural neighborhoods, both of which Moreno and others argue would improve the urban experience and boost community participation in the planning process. Digitalization is a key aspect of the 15-minute city derived from smart cities. Moreno and others argue that a Fourth Industrial Revolution has reduced the need for commuting because of access to technology like virtual communication and online shopping. They conclude by stating that these four components, when implemented at scale, would form an accessible city with a high quality of life.

Larson and the 20-minute city 
Kent Larson described the concept of a 20-minute city in a 2012 TED talk, and his City Science Group at the MIT Media Lab has developed a neighborhood simulation platform to integrate the necessary design, technology, and policy interventions into "compact urban cells". In his "On Cities" masterclass for the Norman Foster Foundation, Larson proposed that the planet is becoming a network of cities, and that successful cities in the future will evolve into a network of high-performance, resilient, entrepreneurial communities.

D'Acci and the T*-minute city 
Since 2013 D'Acci presented the Isobenefit Urbanism, a spontaneous-guided planning approach based on a morphogenetic code inducing a T*-minute city (T*= a reasonable time to reach destination by walking) where one can reach within 1km/1mile: natural land, shops, amenities, services and places of work. It is based on a code for the simulations of Isobenefit urban morphogenesis. It is a code to simulate urban growth scenario by modifying as one wishes the values of the parameters. The latter are related to densities, surface, population size, random factors and built probabilities. This urban growth model results in infinite outputs all satisfying the Isobenefit urbanism objective function.

Weng and the 15-minute walkable neighborhood 
Weng and his colleagues, in a 2019 article using Shanghai as a case study, proposed the 15-minute walkable neighborhood with a focus on health, and specifically non-communicable diseases. The authors suggest that the 15-minute walkable neighborhood is a way to improve the health of residents, and they document existing disparities in walkability within Shanghai. They found that rural areas, on average, are significantly less walkable, and areas with low walkability tend to have a higher proportion of children. Compared to Moreno et al., the authors focused more on the health benefits of walking and differences in walkability and usage across age groups.

Da Silva and the 20-minute city 
Da Silva et al., in their 2019 article cite Tempe, Arizona, as a case study of an urban space where all needs could be met within 20 minutes by walking, biking, or transit. The authors found that Tempe is highly accessible, especially by bike, but that accessibility varies with geographic area. Compared to Moreno et al., the authors focused more on accessibility within the built environment.

Implementations

Africa 
Lagos, Nigeria, converted schools that were closed due to the COVID-19 pandemic into food markets to prevent panic buying. The program also decreased commute times and shored up food supplies within communities.

Asia 
In 2019, Singapore's Land Transport Authority proposed a master plan that included the goals of "20-minute towns" and a "45-minute city" by 2040.

Israel has embraced the concept of a 15-minute city in new residential developments. According to Orli Ronen, the head of the Urban Innovation and Sustainability Lab at the Porter School for Environmental Studies at Tel Aviv University, Tel Aviv, Haifa, Beersheba, and central Jerusalem have been effective in delivering on the concept at least in part in new developments, but only Tel Aviv has been relatively successful.

China 
The 2016 Master Plan for Shanghai called for "15-minute community life circles", where residents could complete all of their daily activities within 15 minutes of walking. The community life circle has been implemented in other Chinese cities, like Baoding and Guangzhou.

The Standard for urban residential area planning and design (GB 50180–2018), a national standard that came into effect in 2018, stipulates four levels of residential areas: 15-min pedestrian-scale neighborhood, 10-min pedestrian-scale neighborhood, 5-min pedestrian-scale neighborhood, and a neighborhood block. Among them, "15-min pedestrian-scale neighborhood" means "residential area divided according to the principle that residents can meet their material, living and cultural demand by walking for 15 minutes; usually surrounded by urban trunk roads or site boundaries, with a population of 50,000 to 100,000 people (about 17,000 to 32,000 households) and complete supporting facilities."

Chengdu, to combat urban sprawl, commissioned the "Great City" plan, where development on the edges of the city would be dense enough to support all necessary services within a 15-minute walk.

Europe 

Paris Mayor Anne Hidalgo introduced the 15-minute city concept in her 2020 re-election campaign and began implementing it during the COVID-19 pandemic. For example, school playgrounds were converted to parks after hours, while the Place de la Bastille and other squares have been revamped with trees and bicycle lanes.

Cagliari, a city on the Italian island of Sardinia, began a strategic plan to revitalize the city and improve  walkability. The city actively solicited public feedback through a participatory planning process, as described in the Moreno model. A unique aspect of the plan calls for re-purposing public spaces and buildings that were no longer being used, relating to the general model of urban intensification.

North America 
In 2012, Portland, Oregon developed a plan for complete neighborhoods within the city, which are aimed at supporting youth, providing affordable housing, and promoting community-driven development and commerce in historically under-served neighborhoods. Similar to the Weng et al. model, the Portland plan emphasizes walking and cycling as ways to increase overall health and stresses the importance of the availability of affordable healthy food. The Portland plan calls for a high degree of transparency and community engagement during the planning process, which is similar to the diversity component of the Moreno et al. model.

South America 
Bogotá, Colombia in March 2021, implemented 84 kilometers of bike lanes to encourage social distancing during the COVID-19 pandemic. This expansion complemented the Ciclovía practice that originated in Colombia in 1974, where bicycles are given primary control of the streets. The resulting bicycle lane network is the largest of its kind in the world.

Oceania 
The city of Melbourne, Australia developed Plan Melbourne 2017–2050 to accommodate growth and combat sprawl. The plan contains multiple elements of the 15-minute city concept, including new bike lanes and the construction of "20-minute neighborhoods".

Implications 
The 15-minute city, with its emphasis on walkability and accessibility, has been put forward as a way to better serve groups of people that have historically been left out of planning, such as women, children, people with disabilities, and the elderly.

Social infrastructure is also emphasized in order to maximize urban functions such as schools, parks, and complementary activities for residents. There is also a large focus on access to green space, which may promote positive environmental impacts such as increasing urban biodiversity and helping to protect the city from invasive species. Studies have found that increased access to green spaces can also have a positive impact on the mental and physical health of a city's inhabitants, reducing stress and negative emotions, increasing happiness, improving sleep, and promoting positive social interactions. Urban residents living near green spaces have also been found to exercise more, improving their physical and mental health.

Limitations 
While the theory has many potential benefits, including reducing car dependence and promoting walkability in urban areas, it also has limitations.

One limitation is the difficulty or impracticality of implementing the 15-minute city concept in established urban areas, where land use patterns and infrastructure are already in place. Additionally, the concept may not be feasible in areas with low population density or in low-income communities where transportation options are limited.

Furthermore, when the concept is applied as a literal spatial analysis research tool, it then refers to the use of an isochrone to express the radius of an area considered local. Isochrones have a long history of utilization in transportation planning and are constructed primarily using two variables: time and speed. However, the reliance on population-wide conventions, such as gait speed, to estimate the buffer zones of accessible areas may not accurately reflect the mobility capabilities of specific population groups, like the elderly. This may result  in potential inaccuracies and fallacies in research models.

Criticism 
While many cities have implemented policies along the 15-minute city concept, disagreement remains over whether the model benefits residents. Georgia Pozoukidou and Zoi Chatziyiannaki write in the journal Sustainability that the creation of dense, walkable urban cores often leads to gentrification or displacement of lower-income residents to outlying neighborhoods due to rising property values; to counteract this, Pozoukidou and Chatziyiannaki argue for affordable housing provisions to be integral to FMC policies. Further, price increases, like those associated with gentrification, could be harmful to marginalized groups like people with disabilities, forcing move-outs.

In addition, critics have noted that models are not universal, as cities with less urban sprawl, like those in Europe, are more likely to implement the concept than are cities with extensive sprawl, like those in Asia and North America. Noted exceptions include Chengdu, which utilized the 15-minute city concept to curb sprawl, and Melbourne, where Sally Capp, the Lord Mayor of Melbourne, stressed the importance of public transit in expanding the radius of the 15-minute city.

Conspiracy theories 
Unfounded conspiracy theories about the 15-minute concept theories have flourished, including claims that the model will fine residents for leaving their home districts. British Conservative Party MP Nick Fletcher called 15-minute cities an "international socialist concept" during a debate in the UK Parliament in February 2023.

See also

References

External links
 
 
 
 
</ref>.

Sustainable urban planning
New Urbanism
Transportation planning